Restrictions is the third studio album by American hard rock band Cactus, released in 1971 through Atco Records. The album tracks "Token Chokin'", "Evil", "Alaska" and "Sweet 16" were all released as singles.

The album features heavy blues-rock originals, with a cover of the Howlin' Wolf blues standard "Evil". Stoner rock band Monster Magnet used Cactus' arrangement of the song for their own cover, which appeared on their 1993 album Superjudge.

Track listing
"Restrictions" (R. Day, C. Appice) – 6:16
"Token Chokin'" (R. Day, C. Appice) – 3:08
"Guiltless Glider" (R. Day, T. Bogert, C. Appice, J. McCarty) – 8:44
"Evil" (Willie Dixon) – 3:15
"Alaska" (J. McCarty, T. Bogert, R. Day) – 3:40
"Sweet Sixteen" (T. Bogert, R. Day, C. Appice, J. McCarty) – 3:19
"Bag Drag" (J. McCarty, R. Day) – 5:12
"Mean Night in Cleveland" (R. Day, T. Bogert, C. Appice, J. McCarty) – 2:10

Personnel
Cactus
Tim Bogert – bass guitar, backing vocals
Carmine Appice – drums, backing vocals, percussion
Jim McCarty – lead, rhythm and slide guitars
Rusty Day – lead and backing vocals, harmonica, percussion
Additional personnel
Ron Leejack – slide guitar
Albhy Galuten – piano
Duane Hitchings – keyboards

Charts

References

Cactus (American band) albums
1971 albums
Albums recorded at Electric Lady Studios
Atco Records albums